Guyle Abner Fielder (born November 21, 1930) is a retired American-born Canadian professional ice hockey center. He is most known for his time in the minor Western Hockey League, where he played from 1952 to 1973. Fielder also played 9 regular season and 6 playoff games in the National Hockey League between 1951 and 1958. He is the fourth-leading scorer in professional ice hockey history, behind Wayne Gretzky, Jaromír Jágr and Gordie Howe, and holds the career records for minor-league ice hockey for the most games played, assists and points scored.

Playing career
Fielder moved to Nipawin, Saskatchewan with his Canadian parents at an early age and played junior hockey in Prince Albert and Lethbridge before turning professional. Fielder's National Hockey League (NHL) career consisted of 15 games for the Chicago Black Hawks, Detroit Red Wings and Boston Bruins. He played a total of 22 seasons in the Western Hockey League (WHL), mainly for the Seattle Totems, as well as for the New Westminster Royals, the Salt Lake Golden Eagles and the Portland Buckaroos. He also played a single season for the St. Louis Flyers of the American Hockey League and had short stints with the Quebec Aces and the Edmonton Flyers.

Fielder won Rookie of the Year honors with New Westminster in 1952. He was a six-time WHL MVP, including four consecutive awards between 1957 and 1960, the league scoring leader nine times (including two stints of three straight) and a three-time honoree as most gentlemanly player. He won Rookie of the Year honors after his one AHL season in 1953. He was drafted by the Houston Aeros of the WHA in 1972, but chose to remain out west, playing his final season for the Buckaroos in 1973 before retiring.

Among Fielder's scoring feats were four seasons of more than 100 points and 10 seasons of 70 assists or more. His 122 points in 1957 broke the professional record. He retired having scored 438 goals and 1,491 assists for 1,929 points. His point total set a professional record, exceeding Gordie Howe's output to that point, and is still the all-time minor league mark. His assist total is first all-time in the minor leagues, and is double that of his nearest rival. Fielder played in 1,487 games, also the all-time minor league record.

The Seattle Kraken created the Guyle Fielder Award to recognize the player who best exemplifies Fielder's "perseverence, hustle and dedication" over the course of a season. Yanni Gourde won the inaugural award on April 29, 2022.

Career statistics

Regular season and playoffs

Career achievements
 Ed Bruchet Trophy (awarded to the MVP of the WCJHL) – 1950
 WHL Rookie of the Year – 1952
 Dudley "Red" Garrett Memorial Award winner (awarded to the AHL Rookie of the Year) – 1953
 9× WHL leading scorer – 1954, 1957–1960, 1963–1965, 1967
 6× George Leader Cup winner (awarded to the WHL MVP) – 1957–1960, 1964, 1967
 3× Fred J. Hume Cup winner (awarded to the most gentlemanly player in the WHL) – 1966, 1967, 1969
 AHL First All-Star Team – 1953
 WHL First All-Star Team – 1954, 1957, 1958, 1959, 1960, 1963, 1964, 1967
 WHL Second All-Star Team – 1961, 1965, 1966, 1968

References

External links
 
 Entry at Seattlehockey.net

1930 births
Living people
American men's ice hockey centers
Boston Bruins players
Canadian ice hockey centres
Chicago Blackhawks players
Detroit Red Wings players
Edmonton Flyers (WHL) players
Ice hockey people from Idaho
Ice hockey people from Saskatchewan
Lethbridge Native Sons players
New Westminster Royals (WHL) players
People from Latah County, Idaho
People from Nipawin, Saskatchewan
Portland Buckaroos players
Prince Albert Mintos players
Quebec Aces (AHL) players
Seattle Totems (WHL) players
Salt Lake Golden Eagles (WHL) players
St. Louis Flyers players